Violet-Anne Wynne (born 30 March 1987) is an Irish independent politician who has been a Teachta Dála (TD) for the Clare constituency since the 2020 general election. Elected as a Sinn Féin member, she became an independent in February 2022.

Early life and education
Wynne is from Tullamore, County Offaly. She attended St Colman's National School nearby and the Coláiste Mhuire in Blakestown. She studied Psychology at Trinity College Dublin. She is a Protestant and member of the Church of Ireland.  She is a former member of the Reserve Defence Forces, having been involved for three years. She has worked as a home help provider for young adults with disabilities, a literacy tutor, and for the crime victims helpline.

Political career
Wynne ran for the position of councillor in Clare County Council during the May 2019 local elections. She placed 8th out 9 candidates in her local election area of Kilrush, securing 4.2% of the first preference vote.

In 2020, she was chosen by Sinn Féin local branches in Clare to stand for Sinn Féin in the 2020 general election. She had been the local party members' third choice for a candidate, gaining the nomination after their first choice, Councillor Mike McKee, fell ill and died, and their second choice, Noeleen Moran, withdrew from the nomination process after she felt the local branch had not been prompt enough in convening. Wynne had been considered to be a paper candidate in an election Sinn Féin initially did not expect to gain seats in, however, she came second in her constituency with 15% of the first preference vote following a surge in Sinn Féin popularity during the election campaign.

Vaccines
Also following her election, journalist Philip Ryan of the Irish Independent suggested that Wynne previously proposed some vaccine hesitancy views regarding the HPV vaccine relating to cervical cancer. The Sinn Féin press office said Wynne's comments were "old remarks" which did not "reflect Sinn Féin policy".

Social media conduct
In April 2020, Wynne was criticised for her conduct on social media by some of her constituents after she referred to Clare TD Pat Breen and former Clare TD (now Senator) Timmy Dooley as "Prat Breen" and "Timmy Do Nothing". She was also accused of belittling constituents who asked questions in relation to the COVID-19 pandemic. A spokesperson representing Sinn Féin in County Clare referred to her behaviour as "A prime example why the party's social media guidelines should be followed at all times on social media platforms."

Following the criticisms, Wynne issued a formal apology, stating "I understand that a number of remarks I made on Facebook recently have caused offence. I want to apologise for this and to those involved".

Resignation from Sinn Féin
In February 2022, Wynne resigned from Sinn Féin. Wynne alleged that she was the victim of a campaign of “psychological warfare” from members of the local party but that she did not have a problem with Sinn Féin TDs in the Dail.

As part of a press release, Wynne stated "I was a proud Sinn Féin TD and took my membership with the party very seriously, I believed that they were the party for United Irelanders and were the future for this island. I now have experience that I can no longer ignore" and went on to suggest that the party did "not take kindly to autonomy and those who do not follow their plans”. Wynne resolved to continue her work as TD as an Independent.

Sinn Féin Deputy Whip Denise Mitchell responded stating “I am so very sorry to hear of Violet-Anne’s decision this morning. Violet-Anne was a valued member of the Sinn Féin Oireachtas team. The party worked extremely hard over the last two years to resolve challenges at constituency level. That work was continuing."

Personal life
Wynne met her partner, John Montaine, while she was living in Blanchardstown, Dublin. In 2011, the couple decided to settle in Tullycrine near Kilrush, County Clare with their children under the Rural Settlement Scheme when Montaine developed health issues that required a slower-paced lifestyle. Wynne supports Montaine's use of cannabis to manage epilepsy.

In 2016, housing charity Rural Resettlement Ireland obtained a court judgement for rent arrears of €12,126.40 owed by Wynne and Montaine. Rural Resettlement Ireland closed down but its operators suggested she should give the owed amount to another charity. She subsequently agreed to do so. In May 2022 Wynne said she was "homeless", having relied on short-term accommodation since leaving a house rendered too small by the birth of her sixth child in February 2022.

References

Living people
1987 births
21st-century women Teachtaí Dála
Alumni of Trinity College Dublin
Irish Anglicans
Irish women activists
Local councillors in County Clare
Members of the 33rd Dáil
Military personnel from County Offaly
People from Kilrush
People from Tullamore, County Offaly
Politicians from County Laois
Politicians from County Offaly
Sinn Féin TDs (post-1923)
Independent TDs